Pterostichus lama or giant woodland ground beetle is a North American species of woodland ground beetle in the family Carabidae. It is found in California, Nevada, Oregon, and Washington in the United States, and in British Columbia in Canada. These large (15-29 mm), flightless black beetles have strong mandibles. They feed on termites and ants.

References

Further reading

External links

 

Pterostichus
Articles created by Qbugbot
Beetles described in 1843